Yehuda Amital (born Yehuda Klein; 31 October 1924 – 9 July 2010) was an Orthodox rabbi, the Rosh Yeshiva of Yeshivat Har Etzion, and a member of the Israeli cabinet.

The concept of a Hesder Yeshiva is attributed to Amital. After writing an essay about the religious and moral aspects of military service, he envisaged a program for combining army service and Torah study.

In 1991, the Hesder Yeshiva program was awarded the Israel Prize for its special contribution to society and the State of Israel.

Biography
Yehuda Klein (later Amital) was born in Oradea, Romania, son of Yekutiel Ze'ev and Devora. After four years of secular primary education, he began religious studies with Rabbi Chaim Yehuda Levi. When Germany occupied the area in 1944, the Nazis sent his entire family to Auschwitz where they were killed. Amital was sent to a labor camp, thus surviving the Holocaust. He remained in the labor camp for eight months, and was liberated on October 4, 1944, by the Soviet Army. After his liberation, he made his way to Bucharest, from where he travelled to Palestine, arriving on December 11, 1944.

After a short stay at the Atlit detainee camp, he made his way to Jerusalem, where he studied at Hebron Yeshiva, receiving semicha from Rabbi Isser Zalman Meltzer. He also learned with Rabbi Yaakov Moshe Charlap, a student of Rabbi Avraham Yitzchak Kook. Around this time, he joined the Haganah.

After learning at Hebron, he moved to Pardes Hanna in order to learn at Kletzk Yeshiva. While learning at the yeshiva, he married Miriam, the daughter of the Rosh Yeshiva, Rabbi Zvi Yehuda Meltzer, and the granddaughter of Rabbi Isser Zalman Meltzer. When the yeshiva relocated to Rehovot, Amital followed, settling in Rehovot until he moved to Jerusalem in the 1960s.

The day after the Declaration of Independence, Amital's unit was mobilized in the 1948 Arab–Israeli War. He took part in battles of Latrun and the western Galilee. After the war, Amital became a rabbinic secretary in the Beth Din of Rehovot, and, two years later, he became an instructor at Yeshivat HaDarom, where he helped formulate the idea of a Hesder Yeshiva.

After the Six-Day War, he became the founding Rosh Yeshiva of Yeshivat Har Etzion, which he headed for 40 years.

Amital died on July 9 (27 Tammuz), 2010, and was laid to rest in the Har HaMenuchot cemetery in Jerusalem, where thousands attended his funeral.

Political career
In 1988, Amital founded the left-leaning religious Meimad movement, and was elected as its chairman after it became a political party. After the assassination of Prime Minister Yitzhak Rabin in November 1995, he served as a minister without portfolio in the government of Shimon Peres, despite not being a Knesset member.

Educational career
After the Six-Day War he founded Yeshivat Har Etzion, a Hesder Yeshiva in Gush Etzion which opened in Kfar Etzion in 1968 with 30 students and moved to its current location in Alon Shvut two years later. In 1971 Amital asked Aharon Lichtenstein to join him as Rosh Yeshiva.

At the age of 80, Amital asked the management of Yeshivat Har Etzion to select his successors. The yeshiva chose rabbis Yaakov Medan and Baruch Gigi. On January 4, 2006, Medan and Gigi were officially invested as co-roshei yeshiva, alongside Amital and Aharon Lichtenstein.

On September 25, 2008, Amital announced that on the last day of Tishrei, 5769 (October 28, 2008) he would retire and Mosheh Lichtenstein, the son of Aharon Lichtenstein, would become the fourth Rosh Yeshiva.

Relationship with Elazar Shach 
Rabbi Elazar Shach had been a student of Rav Isser Zalman Meltzer in Europe and he eventually married Rav Meltzer's niece. Rav Amital married Rav Meltzer's granddaughter.

The two developed a very close relationship. When they were both teachers at Yeshivat HaDarom in Rehovot, Rav Amital and Rav Shach were known to argue constantly about Zionism, the fledgling State of Israel, and the necessity of drafting yeshiva students into the army. Despite an age gap of almost 25 years, the cousins-by-marriage would bounce ideas and bum cigarettes off of one another as they debated the pressing issues of the day.

Eventually, they went their separate ways. Rav Shach became the head of the renowned Ponevezh Yeshiva in Bnei Brak and the firebrand ideological and political leader of the Lithuanian charedi community. Rav Amital went on to establish Yeshivat Har Etzion, a flagship religious-Zionist institution, in Alon Shevut, and later co-founded the dovish religious-Zionist Meimad party. Years later, the two happened to meet somewhere, whereupon Rav Shach embraced Rav Amital and said: “Reb Yehuda, Reb Yehuda! We’re so far apart now that we don’t even argue!”

When Rav Shach passed away, Rav Amital told the following story. He said that a ba'al teshuva once came to Rav Shach. His less religious parents wanted him to come home and visit. They were willing to keep the house kosher for that purpose, but in the area where they lived there was only Rabbanut kashrut, and not the standard of Badatz that the son kept. With tears Rav Amital told Rav Shach's response, “Rabbanut lo treif.” – "Rabbanut food is not treif." Rav Amital explained, even if it is not up to your standard, how can you let that interfere with your connection with your parents and your kibbud av va-eim?

Published works
Jewish Values in a Changing World 
Commitment and Complexity: Jewish Wisdom in an Age of Upheaval 
When God is Near: On the High Holidays ISBN 9781592644377
A World Built, Destroyed and Rebuilt, Rabbi Yehudah Amital's Confrontation with the Memory of the Holocaust 
By Faith Alone: The Story of Rabbi Yehuda Amital 
והארץ נתן לבני אדם - A Hashkafic book based on Sichot he gave at Yeshivat Har Etzion, Tevunot Publishing, 2004.

References

External links

Alan Brill, "Worlds Destroyed, Worlds Rebuilt: The Religious Thought of R. Yehudah Amital"
Series of shiurim by R. Yehuda Amital entitled Jewish Values in a Changing World, posted by The Israel Koschitzky Virtual Beit Midrash of Yeshivat Har Etzion
Updated biography
Updated bibliography
Hespedim (eulogies) given for Rav Yehuda Amital zt"l
לעבדך באמת, לדמותו ולדרכו של הרב יהודה עמיטל, עורכים: ראובן ציגלר וראובן גפני 
By Faith Alone, The Story of Rav Yehuda Amital, by Elyashiv Reichner
 Yehudah Mirsky, The Audacity of Faith 
https://www.academia.edu/18122334/Torah_and_Humanity_in_a_Time_of_Rebirth_Rav_Yehuda_Amital_as_Educator_and_Thinker, Reuven Ziegler and Yehudah Mirsky, Torah and Humanity in a Time of Rebirth: Rav Yehuda Amital as Educator and Thinker

1924 births
2010 deaths
Government ministers of Israel
Israeli Orthodox rabbis
Leaders of political parties in Israel
Meimad politicians
Holocaust survivors
People from Oradea
Religious Zionist rosh yeshivas
Yeshivat Har Etzion
Burials at Har HaMenuchot
Romanian emigrants to Mandatory Palestine
20th-century Romanian Jews
21st-century Romanian Jews
Jewish Israeli politicians
20th-century Israeli Jews
21st-century Israeli Jews
Rabbinic members of the Knesset
20th-century Israeli rabbis
21st-century Israeli rabbis
Religious Zionist Orthodox rabbis
Jewish military personnel